Andrew Feldman may refer to:

 Andrew Feldman, Baron Feldman of Elstree (born 1966), British Conservative politician
 Andrew Feldman (poker player) (born 1987), English poker player
 Andrew Barth Feldman (born 2002), American actor